Sega is a multinational video game software developer and hardware development company.

Sega or SEGA may also refer to:
 Sega (genre), a music genre that originated in Mauritius
 Sega Pinball, a former division of Sega for pinball and arcade machines
 Subependymal giant cell astrocytoma, a low grade brain tumor associated with tuberous sclerosis

People with the surname
 Andrew Sega (born 1975), American musician
 Filippo Sega (1537–1596), Italian bishop and cardinal
 Francesco della Sega (1528-1565), Italian antitrinitarian executed by the Venetian Inquisition
 Giovanni del Sega (c. 1450–1527), Italian painter
 Ronald M. Sega (born 1952), professor of systems engineering, former NASA astronaut